Jadovnik is a mountain in the municipality of Drvar, Bosnia and Herzegovina.

See also
List of mountains in Bosnia and Herzegovina

References

Mountains of Bosnia and Herzegovina